Amelia Abascal Gómez (born 8 February 1920) was a Spanish-born Mexican painter, sculptor, and ceramist.

Life and career 
Abascal was born in Madrid, Spain in 1920. She was primarily a self-taught artist. After arriving in Mexico in 1940 at the age of 20, she took classes in chemistry, and applied it to her plastic arts, painting, ceramics, and designing. She was one of four artists to represent Mexico in 1968 at an exhibition in Argentina of Latin American painting. Following the Exhibition in Argentina, Abascal won acclaim with a solo exhibition at the Misrachi Art Gallery in Mexico City, Mexico in 1968.

Abascal's work involves treating bronze and copper sheets with acid to create an eroded texture. She specializes in relief sculpture, but has also produced murals.

Works 
Abascal's acid-treated copper plates were shown at the 1967 Galería de Arte Mexicano which was held in Mexico City, Mexico during the months of January and February. The plates were described by a critic as "abstracted vigor on to copper plates."

At the 1967 Galería de Arte Mexicano alongside Abascal's acid-treated copper plates were pieces from Carlos Merida whom is credited as being one of the first Latin artists to combine European and Latin styles in painting.

References

1920 births
Possibly living people
Mexican women painters
Mexican women sculptors
20th-century Mexican ceramists
Mexican women ceramists
20th-century Mexican painters
20th-century Mexican sculptors
21st-century Mexican painters
21st-century Mexican sculptors
Artists from Madrid
Spanish emigrants to Mexico
Mexican muralists
Women muralists
21st-century ceramists
20th-century Mexican women artists
21st-century Mexican women artists